Dr. Facundo Ynsfrán Caballero (27 November 1860 – 9 January 1902) was Vice President of Paraguay from 1894 to 1898. He had previously served in Congress and founded Paraguay's School of Medicine. He was killed during an anti-Aceval tumult in Parliament on 9 January 1902.

References 

Vice presidents of Paraguay
Presidents of the Senate of Paraguay
Paraguayan physicians
Paraguayan murder victims
1860 births
1902 deaths